The Seattle Pilots were an American professional baseball team based in Seattle, Washington during the 1969 Major League Baseball season. During their single-season existence, the Pilots played their home games at Sick's Stadium and were a member of the West Division of Major League Baseball's American League. On April 1, 1970, the franchise moved to Milwaukee, Wisconsin and became the Milwaukee Brewers.

The "Pilots" name originated from team president Dewey Soriano's part-time job as a harbor pilot and the city's association with the aviation industry.  The team colors were royal blue and gold (with accessory red in the logo: helm and baseball seams). Seattle had long been a hotbed for minor league baseball and was home to the Seattle Rainiers, a successful team in the Pacific Coast League (PCL). At the time, Seattle was the third-biggest metropolitan area on the West Coast. The then-Cleveland Indians (now Guardians) briefly considered a move to Seattle in 1964 but opted to stay in the city. In 1967, Charles Finley looked to move his Kansas City Athletics to Seattle, but ended up moving the Athletics to Oakland, California instead. There was no real competition from other professional teams at the time in the city. While Seattle had landed the National Basketball Association (NBA)'s SuperSonics (now the Oklahoma City Thunder) in 1967, the NBA was not as popular as baseball was at the time. The NFL would come to the city in 1976 with the addition of the expansion Seahawks, followed by the NHL in 2021 with the addition of the expansion Kraken.

Formation

The lead man for the franchise ownership, Pacific Northwest Sports, Inc. (PNSI), was Dewey Soriano, a former Rainiers pitcher and general manager and former president of the Pacific Coast League. In an ominous sign of things to come, Soriano had to ask William R. Daley, who owned the Indians during the time they flirted with moving to Seattle, to underwrite much of the purchase price. In return, Soriano sold Daley 47% of the stock, making him the team's largest shareholder. Daley became chairman of the board, while Soriano remained team president.

A couple of factors were beyond the Pilots' control. They were originally not set to start play until  along with the Kansas City Royals.  However, the date was moved back to  under pressure from Senator Stuart Symington of Missouri. Professional baseball had been played in Kansas City in one form or another from  until the A's left for Oakland after the  season, and Symington would not accept the prospect of Kansas City having to wait three years for baseball to return there. The American League would not allow only one new team to enter the league, as the resulting odd number of teams would unbalance the schedule. That meant that Kansas City and Seattle had to be admitted together.

Also, the Pilots had to pay the PCL $1 million to compensate for the loss of one of its most successful franchises. After King County voters approved a bond for a domed stadium (what would become the Kingdome) in February 1968 with 62% in favor, the Seattle Pilots were officially born. California Angels executive Marvin Milkes was hired as general manager, and Joe Schultz, a coach with the National League champion St. Louis Cardinals, became manager.

Team issues

Schultz and Milkes both optimistically predicted that the Pilots could finish third in the newly formed, six-team American League West. However, the Pilots experienced the typical struggles of a first-year expansion team. They won their first game, and then their home opener three days later, but only won five more times in the first month. Nevertheless, the Pilots stayed within striking distance of .500 for much of the spring, and were only six games out of the AL West lead as late as June 28. But a disastrous 9–20 July ended even a faint hope of any kind of contention, though they were still in third place as late as August. However, a 6-22 August sent them into the AL West basement for good. The team finished the season with a record of 64–98, 33 games behind division winner Minnesota and five games behind their expansion brethren, the Royals. Only Cleveland had a worse record in the American League. On the plus side, they did finish 12 games ahead of the two National League expansion teams, Montreal and San Diego, both of whom lost 110 games.

However, the team's poor play was the least of its troubles. The most obvious problem was Sicks' Stadium. The longtime home of the Rainiers, it had once been considered one of the best ballparks in minor league baseball. By the 1960s, however, it was considered far behind the times. While a condition of awarding the Pilots to Seattle was that Sicks' had to be expanded to 30,000 seats, only 19,500 seats were ready by Opening Day because of numerous delays. The scoreboard was not even ready until the night before the season opener. By June there were finally 25,000 seats in place. Water pressure was almost nonexistent after the seventh inning, especially with crowds above 8,000. The Pilots had a total attendance of 677,944 people for the season, 20th out of 24 teams in Major League Baseball, and their average attendance per game, 8,268, was also 20th. Seattle finished above fellow cellar dweller teams like the Cleveland Indians, Chicago White Sox, Philadelphia Phillies, and the expansion San Diego Padres. The other two expansion teams outdrew the Pilots, with the Kansas City Royals having 902,414 attend their games while the Montreal Expos finished 10th in attendance with 1,212,608. The highest attendance for a Pilots home game was 23,657, on August 3 against the New York Yankees. The lowest attendance for a Pilot home game was on April 29, their 17th game, when a reported 1,954 fans showed up to watch them play the California Angels. The Pilots lost several hundred thousand dollars their first and only season. The team's new stadium was slated to be built at the Seattle Center, but a petition by stadium opponents ground the project to a halt. The project was later moved to south of downtown and developed for the Kingdome.

Relocation
By the end of the season, the Pilots were gasping.  However, Daley refused to put up more financing.  It was obvious that they would not survive long enough to move into their new park without new ownership.  It was also obvious that the timetable for a new stadium would have to be significantly advanced, as Sicks' Stadium was inadequate even for temporary use.

During the offseason, Soriano made contact with car salesman and former Milwaukee Braves minority owner Bud Selig, who was leading the effort to bring major league baseball back to Milwaukee. They met in secret for over a month towards the end of the season, and during Game 1 of the World Series, Soriano agreed to sell the Pilots to Selig for $10.8 million. Selig would then move the team to Milwaukee.

However, the remaining owners of the Pilots turned it down in the face of pressure from Washington's two senators, Warren Magnuson and Henry M. "Scoop" Jackson, as well as state attorney general Slade Gorton. Local theater chain owner Fred Danz came forward in October 1969 with a $10 million deal, but it fizzled when the Bank of California called in a $4 million loan it had made to Soriano and Daley to finance the purchase of the franchise. In January 1970, Westin Hotels head Eddie Carlson put together a nonprofit group to buy the team. However, the owners of the other major league teams rejected the idea almost out of hand, since it would have devalued the other clubs' worth. A slightly modified deal came one vote short of approval.

Bankruptcy

After a winter and spring full of court action, the Pilots reported for spring training under new manager Dave Bristol, unsure of where they would play. The owners had given tentative approval to the Milwaukee group, but the state of Washington got an injunction on March 16 to stop the deal. PNSI immediately filed for bankruptcy — a move intended to forestall post-sale legal action. At the bankruptcy hearing a week later, Milkes testified there was not enough money to pay the coaches, players, and office staff. Had Milkes been more than 10 days late in paying the players, they would have all become free agents and left Seattle without a team for the  season. With this in mind, Federal Bankruptcy Referee Sidney Volinn declared the Pilots bankrupt on April 1—six days before Opening Day—clearing the way for them to move to Milwaukee. The team's equipment had been sitting in Provo, Utah, with the drivers awaiting word on whether to drive toward Seattle or Milwaukee.  The move came so late that Selig had to scrap his initial plans to change the team's colors to navy and red in honor of the minor-league Brewers of his youth.  Instead, the Brewers were stuck using old Pilots' uniforms, with the team name replaced.  One legacy of the Brewers' roots in Seattle is that their colors are still blue and gold, although the shades have been darker since 2000.

Ball Four

Jim Bouton was a Pilots relief pitcher through most of 1969, his contract having been sold to the Seattle Pilots by the New York Yankees in mid-1968. His book Ball Four is based on a journal that Bouton kept during the 1969 season. Bouton spent most of the season with Seattle, although he was traded to the Houston Astros in late August.

Lawsuit and enfranchisement of the Seattle Mariners

In 1970, in the aftermath of the Pilots' purchase and relocation to Milwaukee, the City of Seattle, King County, and the state of Washington (represented by then-State Attorney General Slade Gorton) sued the American League for breach of contract.

The Pilots lawsuit continued until 1976. At trial, the American League offered to give Seattle an expansion baseball franchise in return for dropping the suit, and details were ironed out over the next year. To keep the league with an even number of teams, a formal expansion proceeding was held, with a second team, the Blue Jays, being awarded to the city of Toronto (also allowing both leagues to place a team in Canada, the National League's Montreal Expos [now the Washington Nationals] having been established in 1969). Seattle's new team would be known as the Mariners, and would initially incorporate the same blue and gold colors used by the Pilots (since 1993, they have worn teal, navy blue and silver for their color scheme).

List of Seattle Pilots seasons

See also
 History of the Milwaukee Brewers § Roots in Seattle
 Milwaukee Brewers § Seattle (1969)
 Seattle Mariners
 Selig v. United States

References

Further reading
Allen, Rick (2020). Inside Pitch: Insiders Reveal How the Ill-Fated Seattle Pilots Got Played into Bankruptcy in One Year. Tacoma, WA: Persistence Press. .
Bill Mullins, Becoming Big League:  Seattle, the Pilots, and Stadium Politics
Kenneth Hogan, The 1969 Seattle Pilots: Major League Baseball's One-Year Team
Carson Van Lindt, The Seattle Pilots Story
Jim Bouton, Ball Four (a diary of his season with the Pilots and the Houston Astros)

 
Milwaukee Brewers
Baseball in Seattle
Professional baseball teams in Washington (state)
Defunct baseball teams in Washington (state)
Baseball teams disestablished in 1969
Baseball teams established in 1969
Companies that filed for Chapter 11 bankruptcy in 1970
Defunct Major League Baseball teams